India competed at the 2000 Summer Olympics in Sydney, Australia.

Medalists

Competitors

Athletics

Track & road events

Men

Women

Field Events

Men

Women

Combined - Women's Heptahthalon

Badminton

Boxing

Equestrian

Field hockey

The Indian field hockey team didn't make it to the semis, and finished in seventh position after a 2–3 loss against England in the classification match.

Roster:

 Jude Menezes (gk)
 Devesh Chauhan (gk) 
 Dilip Tirkey
 Dinesh Nayak
 Lazarus Barla
 Baljit Singh Saini
 Sukhbir Singh Gill
 Mohammed Riaz
 Thirumal Valavan
 Ramandeep Singh (captain)
 Mukesh Kumar
 Dhanraj Pillay
 Baljit Singh Dhillon
 Sameer Dad
 Deepak Thakur
 Gagan Ajit Singh

Judo

Rowing

Shooting

Swimming

Table Tennis

Tennis

Weightlifting

Men

Women

Wrestling

References
Wallechinsky, David (2004). The Complete Book of the Summer Olympics (Athens 2004 Edition). Toronto, Canada. .
International Olympic Committee (2001). The Results. Retrieved 12 November 2005.
Sydney Organising Committee for the Olympic Games (2001). Official Report of the XXVII Olympiad Volume 1: Preparing for the Games. Retrieved 20 November 2005.
Sydney Organising Committee for the Olympic Games (2001). Official Report of the XXVII Olympiad Volume 2: Celebrating the Games. Retrieved 20 November 2005.
Sydney Organising Committee for the Olympic Games (2001). The Results. Retrieved 20 November 2005.
International Olympic Committee Web Site

Nations at the 2000 Summer Olympics
2000 Summer Olympics
Summer Olympics